Babetida Sadjo, born on September 19, 1983 in Bafatá, Guinea-Bissau, is a Belgian actress.

Biography 
Babetida grew up in Guinea-Bissau until she was 12 years old, before moving to Hanoi in Vietnam where she attended the Lycée français Alexandre Yersin for 4 years. It was there that she learned French and discovered theater.

Her family moved to Herstal in Belgium where she completed her secondary studies. She continued her theatrical training at the Antoine Vitez Center.

Finally, she moved to Brussels to enter the Royal Conservatory of Brussels and obtained her Dramatic Art diploma in 2007.

It was with Waste Land, in her role as Aysha alongside Jérémie Renier, that she gained national recognition and won the award for Best Supporting Actress at the Ostend Film Festival in 2015.

Her next part was in The Paradise Suite by Joost van Ginkel, but it was her role as Adja, a young illegal immigrant who arrived in Iceland, in And Breathe Normally by Ísold Uggadóttir that she began her international career.

She was also a member of the jury of the Liège International Police Film Festival in 2018.

Her most recent role is in the 2020 Netflix TV show Into the Night.

Filmography 
 2009 : Protect and Serve by Éric Lavaine : The hospital hostess
 2012 : Ombline de Stéphane Cazes : Supervisor Elsa
 2013 : 9 Month Stretch by Albert Dupontel : The victim of the sink
 2014 : Waste Land by Pieter Van Hees : Aysha Tshimanga
 2015 : The Paradise Suite by Joost van Ginkel : Angele
 2017 : And Breathe Normally by Ísold Uggadóttir : Adja

Awards

Won 
 2015 : Ensors 2015 - Best Supporting Actress for Waste Land

Nominated 
 2016 : Magritte 2016 - Best Supporting Actress for Waste Land

References

External links 
 
 

Belgian actresses
1983 births
Living people